Mladen Ivančić (born 8 February 1970) is a Croatian former professional football defender. As a player, he spent seven seasons with HNK Rijeka in Croatia’s Prva HNL. He also spent a season playing for Austria Wien. He retired from football in 2003 and has become a manager. He was Rijeka manager in 2008.

Career statistics

Player
Source:

Manager

References

External links

1970 births
Living people
Footballers from Rijeka
Association football central defenders
Croatian footballers
HNK Orijent players
HNK Rijeka players
FK Austria Wien players
First Football League (Croatia) players
Croatian Football League players
Austrian Football Bundesliga players
Croatian expatriate footballers
Expatriate footballers in Austria
Croatian expatriate sportspeople in Austria
Croatian football managers
HNK Rijeka managers
HNK Rijeka non-playing staff